Powell Clothing Store is a historic commercial building at 201 North Main Street in Beebe, Arkansas.  It is a two-story brick building, built about 1885 in what was then the city's economic heart.  It is a basically vernacular structure, with modest brick corbelling on the cornice and panels of the front facade.  It is one of only a few commercial buildings to survive in the city from that period.

The building was listed on the National Register of Historic Places in 1991.

See also
National Register of Historic Places listings in White County, Arkansas

References

Commercial buildings on the National Register of Historic Places in Arkansas
Commercial buildings completed in 1885
Buildings and structures in Beebe, Arkansas
National Register of Historic Places in White County, Arkansas
1885 establishments in Arkansas